Woodpecker Ridge is a ridge located in the Catskill Mountains of New York southwest of Pine Hill. Mill Brook Ridge is located north of Woodpecker Ridge.

References

Mountains of Ulster County, New York
Mountains of New York (state)